Adnagulovo (Aźnağol) is a rural locality (a selo) in Tatar-Ulkanovsky Selsoviet, Tuymazinsky District, Bashkortostan, Russia. The population was 258 as of 2010. There are 4 streets.

Geography 
Adnagulovo is located 17 km southeast of Tuymazy (the district's administrative centre) by road. Kain-Yelga is the nearest rural locality.

References 

Rural localities in Tuymazinsky District